Laringa is a genus of nymphalid butterfly found in South-east Asia.

Species
Laringa horsfieldii (Boisduval, 1833) India, Andamans, Java, Sumatra Burma, Thailand, North Peninsular Malaya
Laringa castelnaui (C. & R. Felder, 1860) Malaysia, Borneo, Philippines, Sumatra. Java, Palawan, Nias

References

External links

Images representing Laringa at Consortium for the Barcode of Life

Biblidinae
Nymphalidae genera
Taxa named by Frederic Moore